The Battle of Spilia is the name given in Greek Cypriot sources to a minor engagement of the Cyprus Emergency that took place in the neighbourhood of the Cypriot village of Spilia on  either 11 or 12 December 1955. The engagement involved approximately 12 members of Georgios Grivas’s EOKA group and a 40 man detachment of the 45 Commando Royal Marines.
In British military sources this is known as part of a wider operation known as ‘Foxhunter’ that was tasked with breaking up the EOKA presence in the Troodos mountains and capturing EOKA leader Georgios Grivas.

Grivas’ memoirs describe the event as a disaster for the British in which a small band of EOKA fighters took on a large ambushing force of British soldiers. He claims that he heard after the fact that there were at least 50 casualties although British sources claim ‘two slightly wounded’. Grivas claims Lieutenant Colonel Tailyour was killed in action even though Tailyour went on to serve as Commandant General Royal Marines dying in 1979.

British sources state that a Greek man was arrested in the vicinity carrying a rifle and cordex fuses and gave Grivas’ location away during interrogation. A 40 man patrol then set off in search of the hideout. Grivas and his men managed to escape and 2 Marines were ‘slightly wounded’ in a friendly fire incident when a mortar exploded on tree branches. 
The engagement resulted in Grivas’s escape but with the EOKA no longer able to operate in the Spilia area.

During the battle British units from the north and ones from the south, unable to see in the fog and in the belief that they were surrounded by EOKA fighters, engaged each other in an eight-hour firefight involving airstrikes, artillery bombardments, and heavy weapons. This firefight caused 250 casualties, including 127 deaths, 102 injuries, and 21 missing, making it the deadliest friendly fire incident of the war.

References

  Grigoris Afxentiou, a Cypriot fighter
   Learn About Cyprus article (Greek language article about Grigoris Afxentiou)
  

Spilia
1955 in Cyprus
Spilia
Friendly fire incidents
EOKA
Cyprus Emergency
December 1955 events in Europe